KOSF (103.7 FM) is a commercial classic hits radio station that is licensed to San Francisco, California. Owned by iHeartMedia, the station serves the San Francisco Bay Area. The KOSF studios are located in San Francisco's SoMa district, while the station transmitter is based atop San Bruno Mountain near Daly City.

KOSF broadcasts in HD Radio with two digital subchannels.

History

Early years
The former ABC Radio-owned station started on November 3, 1947 as KGO-FM. In earlier days, it simulcast its sister station, KGO (810 AM), occasionally airing a stereo version of The Lawrence Welk Show. By the late 1960s, as the Federal Communications Commission (FCC) began requiring FM stations to offer separate programming from that of their AM counterparts, KGO-FM, like other ABC-owned FM stations, was an outlet for Love, an automated progressive rock format.

KGO-FM changed its call sign to KSFX in early 1971, keeping its progressive rock format until May 1973. At that time, KSFX aired a top 40 "Musicradio" approach, similar to WABC in New York City. By late 1974, the station veered towards a dance/soul-flavored format. During the late 1970s, KSFX had a brief run with a disco format.

In late 1980, KSFX switched to an album-oriented rock (AOR) format modeled after sister station KLOS in Los Angeles. This lasted until May 1982, when stiff competition from KMEL and CBS-owned KRQR prompted KSFX to drop AOR for talk, featuring the ABC-syndicated Talkradio network. Switching back to the KGO-FM call sign, the FM signal complemented the primarily local talk programming of its AM sister station.

ABC sold the station on January 1, 1984, to Weaver, Davis, Fowler (WDF), which owned KLOK in San Jose; accordingly, the station was renamed KLOK-FM. KLOK-FM had an interactive adult contemporary format called "Yes/No Radio" in which listeners would call in their votes on whether songs should remain on or to be removed from the playlist.

Smooth jazz
In 1987, the station was sold to Brown Broadcasting Corporation, the call sign was changed to KKSF and under the direction of former KIFM programmer-turned-consultant Bob O'Connor and associate Michael Fischer, the format was switched to new adult contemporary (NAC), which would later evolve to smooth jazz. KKSF debuted on July 31, 1987 at midnight; the first song played was "Back In The High Life Again" by Steve Winwood. The general manager from 1987 to 1997 was David A. Kendrick. Liner notes of the first KKSF Sampler for AIDS Relief list the members of the group responsible for the development of the KKSF concept as Willet Brown, Mike Brown, Dave Kendrick, Phil Melrose, Bob O'Connor, Michael Fischer, and Steve Feinstein.

Steve Feinstein, who had previously been a format editor at trade magazine Radio & Records, was chosen by consultant Bob O'Connor and GM Dave Kendrick to be KKSF's first program director. Until his death in 1996, Feinstein guided KKSF to be one of the leading stations in the NAC format. He was known for being open and responsive to listener comments and suggestions, and constantly searched for new and interesting music that fit the KKSF sound, often gravitating to lesser-known imports and hard-to-find, out-of-print selections.

In 1988, the station teamed with the San Francisco AIDS Foundation to produce their first KKSF Sampler for AIDS Relief album. Songs were donated by their artists so that KKSF could give all the net proceeds from the sale of the Sampler albums to the foundation. Often, the Sampler CDs were the only way to find certain KKSF listener favorites that had otherwise gone out of print. There were seven KKSF Samplers produced by Dave Kendrick and Steve Feinstein, with Sampler 7 being dedicated to Feinstein's memory, as he died in September 1996, during the album's creation.

KKSF was the first commercial radio station to have a presence on the World Wide Web. In October 1993, the station launched a website created by chief engineer Tim Pozar and morning host Roger Coryell, using the URL http://kksf.tbo.com and later http://www.kksf.com. The site was hosted by Internet service provider TLGNet, which was co-founded by Pozar.

In 1993, Brown Broadcasting purchased classical station KDFC (then at 102.1 FM). The two stations were co-located at 455 Market Street until 1997, when both were sold to Evergreen Media. Evergreen sold KDFC to Bonneville International that same year but kept KKSF, which eventually passed to Chancellor Broadcasting, AMFM Broadcasting, and finally Clear Channel Communications (which became iHeartMedia in 2014) during a short period of rapid ownership changes in the late 1990s. Studios were moved to their present location at 340 Townsend Street in 1998.

The sound of KKSF changed with the new ownership. The smooth jazz consultancy Broadcast Architecture became more involved with the station at this time. Gradually, the station became more like other stations in the US using the "Smooth Jazz" handle, dropping some of its more eclectic music along the way in favor of mass appeal R&B songs.

The 2000s brought many changes to KKSF. In 2001, many announcers left, with a number of them going to former sister station KDFC. Former KKSF morning host John Evans joined KDFC where he hosted the afternoon show for seven years. Through the next eight years, the number of live announcers on staff gradually decreased, as KKSF began airing syndicated programming in morning drive, like the national Wake Up with Whoopi show hosted by Whoopi Goldberg, and later The Ramsey Lewis Morning Show, featuring pianist Ramsey Lewis. In 2008, KKSF added The Dave Koz Radio Show in afternoons. By the end of the smooth jazz era at KKSF, only midday personality Miranda Wilson was truly live in her time slot.

Classic rock and classic hits
On May 18, 2009, at 3 p.m., KKSF flipped to classic rock, branded as "103.7 The Band". Owner Clear Channel cited economic considerations and the results of "exhaustive market research". The first song on "The Band" was "Everybody's Everything" by Santana. The demise of smooth jazz on KKSF also ended one of the Bay Area's most spirited radio rivalries, that with urban adult contemporary station KBLX-FM, which often included smooth jazz as part of its "quiet storm" format.

In its first few months as "The Band", KKSF increased its listenership among adults ages 25–54, considered a more desirable group by advertisers than KKSF's previous audience, which skewed considerably older. The station featured mostly out-of-market personalities who voice-track their shows, and had a very small local staff.

KKSF began shifting towards a classic hits format in February 2011 after Entercom added classic rock on KUZX (using the frequency of KKSF's one-time sister station KDFC). The classic hits format had previously been heard on CBS Radio's KFRC-FM, which became a simulcast of all-news KCBS in October 2008. The transition to classic hits was completed on April 8, 2011 at 3 p.m., when the station rebranded as "Oldies 103.7". The last song on "The Band" was "Changes" by David Bowie, while the first song on "Oldies" was "I Got You (I Feel Good)" by James Brown. The branding was changed to simply "103.7 FM" in December. On January 3, 2012, KKSF changed its call sign to KOSF.

In November 2013, KOSF adopted a new on-air moniker, "The Bay's 103.7". The station rebranded again on May 2, 2014 at 5 p.m., this time to "Big 103.7". No programming changes were made in either case. The first song on "Big" was "Born to Be Wild" by Steppenwolf.

On June 6, 2016, iHeartMedia announced that KOSF would flip to all-1980s hits as "iHeart80s @ 103.7" that day at noon. The change came after its namesake webstream was ranked the most-listened-to stream on the iHeartRadio streaming platform and mobile application for 2016. The last song on Big was "Last Dance" by Donna Summer, and the first song on iHeart80s was "We Built This City" by San Francisco band Starship. KOSF aired commercial-free for its first eight days. Legendary MTV VJ Martha Quinn began hosting the station's morning show on June 14. This marks the second station in the San Francisco market that has aired an all-1980s format, the first being sister station KIOI from November 2000 to January 2002.

On May 24, 2021, at 10 a.m., KOSF relaunched with a broader-based classic hits format as "80s Plus 103.7"; while 1980s hits still remain the focus of the format, the change saw the station being augmented by songs from the late 1970s and the 1990s, to a certain extent bringing the station closer to what it was prior to the debut of the prior format. The last song as "iHeart '80s" was "Oh Sherrie" by Hanford native Steve Perry, while the first song as "80s Plus" was "I Love Rock 'n' Roll" by Joan Jett & the Blackhearts. Shortly after the move, in January 2022, likely due to popularity of the show, Martha Quinn's morning show was moved to middays and expanded to become a national show across all of iHeart's classic hits stations, including KOSF; to fill in the morning show gap, KOSF promoted Christie James, former midday DJ and co-host of the Martha Quinn Show, to the slot as "Morning Drive with Christie Live", also promoting former show producer Karena Velasquez to co-host.

HD Radio
The station broadcasts digitally using the HD Radio system from iBiquity. KOSF broadcasts two subchannels that can be picked up using an HD Radio-capable receiver:
KOSF-HD1 is a digital simulcast of the analog FM signal.
KOSF-HD2 broadcasts a business news format, branded "Bloomberg Radio", as a simulcast of KNEW (960 AM).

Booster
KOSF is rebroadcast on the following FM booster:

Technical facts
KOSF is a Class B FM station, transmitting from Mt. San Bruno at an effective radiated power of 6,400 watts. A low-powered booster in Pleasanton, California fills in East Bay coverage gaps caused by topography issues.

From the time KKSF started its new adult contemporary format in 1987 to mid-1996, the station used very light audio processing in order to create a signature sound. It was based on the Schulke Beautiful Music approach of having a very light touch to the audio. KKSF's chief engineer, Tim Pozar — who was also one of the co-founders of San Francisco's first ISP, TLGNet — installed an Aphex Systems audio chain of a Compellor and Dominator along with a Digicoder, which was one of the first digital stereo generators.

References

External links

Media

KKSF Domain
MarkMonitor
Clear Channel HD in San Francisco

SFAF Sampler 17

OSF
Classic hits radio stations in the United States
1980s-themed radio stations
Radio stations established in 1947
1947 establishments in California
IHeartMedia radio stations